The Oklahoma–Texas football rivalry is a college football rivalry game between border rivals Oklahoma and Texas. The two teams first played each other in 1900, and the rivalry has been renewed annually and uninterrupted since 1929 for a total of 118 games as of 2022. The rivalry is commonly referred to as the Red River Shootout, or alternatively the Red River Rivalry, or the Red River Showdown. The "Red River" in the name refers to the body of water that runs along much of the border between the states of Texas and Oklahoma.

The game has been played on the second Saturday in October since 1934 (with the exception of select years when it was held on the first Saturday). Since 1932, the game's site has been the Cotton Bowl inside Fair Park in Dallas. The winner of the regular-season matchup receives the Golden Hat, which is a gold ten-gallon hat, formerly of bronze. The trophy is kept by the winning school's athletic department until the next year.

Series history
The first game in the series was played in 1900, when Oklahoma was still a territory. The game was formerly called the Red River Shootout.  For the 100th game in 2005, sponsored by SBC Communications, the game was officially renamed the SBC Red River Rivalry, with the word "Rivalry" replacing "Shootout" out of a desire not to convey an attitude of condoning gun violence. The following year, with SBC's merger with AT&T Corporation, the game was renamed the AT&T Red River Rivalry. In 2014, it became the AT&T Red River Showdown. The term Red River Shootout or Red River Showdown is also applied to meetings between the two schools in sports other than football. During a Q&A session with DeLoss Dodds (the Athletic Director of UT) during the Big 12 restructuring and chaos that ensued thereafter, Dodds stated in an interview, "That game – the rivalry game for us has always been Oklahoma. The A&M game's been a great game and all of that. And we may play 'em. But it's not something that we have to do. I think the Oklahoma game is something we have to do."

Since 1936, the first year of the AP Poll, at least one of the teams has come into the game ranked 70 times, including every one of the last 19 meetings, a streak which ended in 2022 when both teams came into the game unranked and 3–2. Texas leads the overall series . In 2005, The Dallas Morning News asked the 119 Division 1A football coaches to identify the top rivalry game in college football. The Red River Rivalry ranked third, behind only Michigan–Ohio State and Army–Navy.

Throughout the years

1900–1960

The first meeting between Oklahoma and Texas football teams occurred in 1900, before either team had acquired their current nickname. At that time, the Texas team was typically called "Varsity". The write-up in the Austin American-Statesman article referred to the game as a "practice game".  The paper reported:
The game of football yesterday afternoon at the Varsity athletic field was an interesting contrast, notwithstanding the rather one-sided score of 28–2 in favor of the Varsity.
The Oklahoma men played a very good game, but they had weak points and the Varsity men found this out, and proceeded to take advantage of them. For instance, the visitors' tackles and ends were weak, and the Varsity men made most of their gains through these men. Their guards and center, though, were stiff enough, and the Varsity's attack at these points never netted large gains, and were frequently futile.
While Oklahoma should be given credit for the stiffness of her center trio, the fact that the Varsity backs made but small headway at these points is partly due to the Varsity backs themselves. They had not the life and dash that is necessary to successful line plunging, and they failed to heed Coach Thompson's oft repeated admonition to hit the line low and with speed, and the consequence was that when they got to the line they did not have the necessary momentum to plunge on through.
This was the case, notwithstanding the fact that the men are coached to play a good distance behind the line, so that they can get up speed by the time they reach it.

In the 1950 rivalry game, Billy Vessels scored on an 11-yard run late in the contest and Texas native Jim Weatherall kicked the extra point to give Oklahoma a narrow 14–13 win.

In 1958, Texas defeated Oklahoma by one point, breaking the University of Oklahoma's series dominance of the 1950s. The game was notable in that Texas Longhorns head coach Darrell Royal had 10 years earlier been the quarterback for the Oklahoma Sooners. Royal defeated his former coach and mentor Bud Wilkinson in the game. Wilkinson would lose to Texas the next five years before retiring in 1963.

1960–1995
The 1963 game featured No. 1 Oklahoma versus No. 2 Texas, the seventh regular season No. 1 versus No. 2 game (eighth, overall) in the history of the AP Poll.  Texas won the game, took the No. 1 ranking and kept it for the rest of the season, winning its first national championship.

In 1972, Oklahoma spied on Texas' practices, allowing them to block a quick kick the Longhorns had secretly been working on en route to a victory.

The 1976 rivalry game was overshadowed by allegations by Texas coach Darrell Royal that Oklahoma had been spying on his practices. The claim was later confirmed in OU Coach Barry Switzer's book, Bootlegger's Boy. Royal and Switzer (who was 3–0 against Texas as a head coach coming into this game) were involved in a serious feud at the time. The 1976 game was attended by U.S. President Gerald Ford. Ford made an appearance with Royal and Switzer before the game. Switzer and Royal both spoke to Ford but not to each other. The game ended in a 6–6 tie. It was Royal's final Red River Shootout.

In the 1977 game, Texas lost both their starting and backup quarterbacks in the first half. Yet, behind the power running of eventual Heisman Trophy winner Earl Campbell, a strong defense, and the unheralded composure of third-string-quarterback Randy McEachern, the Horns prevailed 13–6.

In a rain-soaked 1984 game, Texas entered the game ranked No. 1, Oklahoma No. 3 (No. 2 in some polls). University of Oklahoma coach Barry Switzer wore a ballcap during the game that read "Beat Texas." This game also marked the only time that future University of Texas at Austin head coach Mack Brown participated in the Red River Shootout not as a Texas Longhorn (Brown was OU's offensive coordinator). Texas jumped to a 10–0 halftime lead but OU rallied to lead 15–12 in the game's closing seconds. With 10 seconds remaining, trailing by 3, Texas was driving and was within field goal range but decided to take one more shot at the end zone. Texas quarterback (and future North Texas head coach) Todd Dodge appeared (in replays) to be intercepted in the end zone by OU's Keith Stanberry, but the officials ruled it incomplete. Texas's Jeff Ward subsequently kicked a field goal and the game ended in a 15–15 tie.

1996–2001
The first Big 12 Conference overtime game, the 1996 meeting featured a John Blake squad under the direction of freshman quarterback Justin Fuente. The game ended Oklahoma 30–Texas 27 after a come from behind victory in the final seven minutes. Jarrail Jackson returned a punt 51 yards for a touchdown, then Fuente completed a 2-point conversion pass to Stephen Alexander to cut the lead to 24–21. The Sooners forced the Longhorns to punt, and drove to the Texas 28. Jeremy Alexander kicked a 44-yard field goal to tie the game at 24.
In overtime, Texas was forced to settle for a 43-yard Phil Dawson field goal, after losing 1 yard on three plays.  Lining up at the Texas 25, James Allen broke a ten-yard run, carried for two and three yards, then caught an 8-yard screen pass from Fuente on 3rd and 5 from the 10. On the next play, Allen took a pitch from Fuente two yards into the endzone, doing what he was unable to do two years before.

The 2000 game was marked by rain and 49-degree weather, but it ended up being noted for bringing the most lopsided margin of victory in the history of the match-up (at that time; Oklahoma would top its feat three years later). Oklahoma came into the game ranked 10th, with Texas ranked 11th. This was the highest combined rankings of the teams since 1984. The Sooners got up to a 42-point lead before Texas scored. Oklahoma won the game 63–14. OU also held Texas to minus-7 yards rushing, an all-time regular-season low for the Longhorns.

Longhorn coach Mack Brown said "It wasn't even a game because we did not play in the first half." Sooner coach Bob Stoops said, "This was a total team victory, everybody made plays. ...We had a little bit of everything." Stoops improved his record vs the Longhorns to 1 win, 1 loss as a result of the game. OU President David Boren cancelled classes the following Monday on account of inclement weather: "It was snowing touchdowns in Dallas."

Sooner running back Quentin Griffin scored six touchdowns, tying the all-time NCAA record for most rushing touchdowns in a game. Oklahoma went on to an undefeated season, and won the 2000 National Championship.

The 2001 game, which ended Oklahoma 14–Texas 3, was a classic defensive struggle that was notable for a play made late in the 4th quarter.

Both the Sooners' and the Longhorns' defenses were outstanding, holding their counterparts to less than 100 yards rushing for the entire game. When either offense could muster any momentum, they were often let down by their kicker-OU's Tim Duncan missed two field goals and UT's Dusty Mangum had one blocked.

OU led 7–3 at the half on a Quentin Griffin 2-yard touchdown in the second quarter. That score held until late in the fourth quarter.

The Sooners got the ball with just over eight minutes to play on their own 20-yard line, and put together a 12-play, 53-yard drive that took them all the way to the Texas 27-yard line. Facing a 4th & 16, OU sent out Tim Duncan for what appeared to be a 44-yard FG attempt. Instead, Duncan sent a pooch punt deep into the Texas zone, which caught UT's Nathan Vasher off guard. Confused, Vasher caught the ball at his own 3-yard line and was immediately downed.

Down 7–3, Texas had 2:06 to drive 97 yards on the stiff Sooner defense. On first down, Texas quarterback Chris Simms' pass was deflected by OU safety Roy Williams, who had blitzed and literally leapt over the blocker, Brett Robin, to collide with Simms at the moment he released the ball. The ball landed right in Oklahoma linebacker Teddy Lehman's hands, who walked into the endzone for a touchdown. The play happened so fast, many fans did not know exactly what had happened. The play by Roy Williams is often called "The Superman Play" because of the way that Williams resembled Superman flying through the air with his arms stretched out at Chris Simms when he hit him. Duncan's extra point sealed the 14–3 OU victory.

2005–2009

The 2005 game, which ended Texas 45–Oklahoma 12, was the 100th meeting in the series and a special logo was created to commemorate the event. The game logo included both team logos, the logo of the sponsor for that game, SBC communications, the number 100, a football, and a star. Prior to the game, the Longhorns were ranked 2nd by the Associated Press, and the Sooners were unranked for the first time since 1999, which was also Texas's last victory over OU.

By breaking the string of five consecutive losses to Oklahoma, Longhorn coach Mack Brown preserved the Longhorns's National Championship hopes. With the win, Texas tied its largest margin of victory in the series. Freshman running back Jamaal Charles set a record for rushing yards by a Texas freshman in the series. With his 80-yard scamper, Charles also had the longest touchdown from scrimmage by a Texas running back in the series.

The game also featured one of the most violent hits in the series history, when Texas DE, Brian Robison, blindsided Oklahoma quarterback, Rhett Bomar, in the 4th quarter, causing a fumble and ensuing touchdown by Longhorn tackle, Rodrique Wright.

As had occurred the two seasons prior, the road to the National Championship game went through Dallas. Oklahoma left the game with a 1–1 conference record and a 2–3 record overall, finishing with a 6–2 conference and 8–4 overall record, including a victory in the Holiday Bowl. The Longhorns improved to 5–0 overall, 2–0 in the Big 12 on their way to an 8–0 conference, 13–0 overall record, including a victory in the Rose Bowl and the 2005 football National Championship.

The 2007 match-up between Oklahoma and Texas was predicted to be the No. 3 game to watch in 2007 by SI.com's "Top 20 Games To Watch In 2007" list, and it did not disappoint. The game was close from start to finish as the Sooners struck first with a quick touchdown pass to TE Jermaine Gresham. QB Colt McCoy's passing attack responded quickly to tie the game for the 'Horns, then again to take a lead, particularly off the efforts of TE Jermichael Finley. The Sooners were able to tie the score going into the half off of another Sam Bradford-to-Jermaine Gresham connection. The Longhorns were able to get into the red zone at the beginning of the second half, but a costly fumble by RB Jamaal Charles at the 5-yard line cut short the momentum. A few series later, RB DeMarco Murray ripped off a 65-yard TD run to give the Sooners a 21–14 lead. The 'Horns did not take this lying down, as they were able to score soon thereafter. The Oklahoma passing attack scored the final touchdown of the game with about ten minutes left to play, on a 35-yard touchdown pass to WR Malcolm Kelly from Bradford. The 'Horns threatened twice in the final waning minutes, as it took a CB Reggie Smith interception and defensive play against star WR Limas Sweed to secure the win for Oklahoma.

The 2008 Meeting of the Red River Rivalry ended Texas 45, Oklahoma 35. Oklahoma ranked No. 1 in the nation and Texas was ranked No. 5. Both were 5–0 coming into the game. In the first quarter, Bradford completed a 5-yard touchdown pass to Manuel Johnson. The Sooners led 7–0. With 6:41 left in the first quarter, Texas answered with a Hunter Lawrence 26-yard field goal. OU scored 2 touchdowns in the second quarter and Texas scored two touchdowns and a field goal including a 96-yard kickoff return by Jordan Shipley. The score at the half was 21–20 OU.

Texas ended up winning this 103rd meeting, 45–35.  At the time, it was the highest scoring event in the history of rivalry (the 2021 game now holds that record, with Oklahoma beating Texas, 55-48), and it was seen by the most fans, a record 92,182.

Recent games

In 2009, Texas won a low scoring game, 16–13. Texas scored one touchdown and three field goals, while OU scored one touchdown and only two field goals. Oklahoma quarterback Sam Bradford had injured his shoulder earlier in the year when playing the BYU Cougars, at Cowboys Stadium in Arlington, TX.  Despite this injury, Bradford started in the 2009 Red River Rivalry confident that his shoulder was healed. However, early in the first quarter a sack by Aaron Williams re-aggravated his injury and forced him out of the game, ending his season and making the Texas game his final college game. Texas quarterback Colt McCoy threw for 127 yards, while the team combined for 142 rushing yards. OU's replacement quarterback, Landry Jones, replaced Bradford and threw for 250 yards of passing with 2 interceptions. The most notable statistic of the game was that the Sooners were held to minus 16 yards of rushing by the Longhorn defense.

In 2012, the 107th meeting of the Longhorns and Sooners, Oklahoma narrowly edged Texas 63 – 21. It appeared that the game would have a very different feel than the 2011 meeting after OU scored its first touchdown and Quandre Diggs of Texas recovered a blocked PAT and ran the distance of the field to score a 2-point conversion. This game had moments that will add to the history of this rivalry: Texas' Damien Williams broke free for a 95-yard touchdown run for the longest rush in Red River Rivalry history. Trey Millard had a 73-yard reception, the longest pass play by an OU player in Red River Rivalry history, surpassing Buddy Leake's 65-yarder in 1953. The Sooners lead the Longhorns most of this game, and Oklahoma ended up with a 677–289 advantage in total yardage and it is third 60+ point Red River scoring effort in Bob Stoops' tenure.

In 2013, Texas came onto the field in Dallas with head coach Mack Brown on the hot seat. Former Longhorn great Earl Campbell had publicly stated two weeks earlier that Mack Brown was "too old" to continue coaching. Brown's players rallied behind their beleaguered coach, however, and Texas won the Red River Rivalry game for the first time since 2009. Texas walked in as major underdogs, in part due to a 1–2 start with an upset loss at BYU and a loss to No. 25 Ole Miss. The game was notable in part because a defensive lineman from each team scored a touchdown on an interception return. In addition, Colt McCoy's brother Case lead the Longhorns to victory, becoming the first quarterback to lead the team to victory since his brother accomplished this feat in 2009.

In 2014, the game was played following both teams' losses the prior weekend. Oklahoma had fallen to No. 11 in the rankings following its loss to No. 25 TCU, with a 4–1 record (1–1 Big 12), whereas Texas had fallen to a 2–3 record after losing to No. 7 Baylor, (also 1–1 Big 12).  Oklahoma's offense had been explosive all five games prior, and its defense had been equally solid. With this being said, Texas' defense was able to prevent an Oklahoma offensive touchdown for the entire first half, and held the Sooners to under 30 total first-half yards, while the Texas Offense gained over 240 yards. In each game of the 2014 season, every team that had led the opposition by more than 200 yards gained was 57–0.  However, another perfect record had been on the line, as Oklahoma's first kick return was returned for a touchdown, and on Texas' first second-quarter possession, Oklahoma's defense forced an interception that was returned for a touchdown, and in every Oklahoma game where that occurred, Oklahoma won (8–0).  Oklahoma was able to widen the halftime score of 17–13 to 31–13 after a pair of offensive touchdowns, but Texas skillfully scored two late touchdowns of their own, failing on the second two-point conversion.  Oklahoma was then able to take several minutes off the clock, and Texas was unable to score on its final possession, ending the game 31–26 in favor of Oklahoma.

In 2015, Oklahoma walked into Dallas No. 10 in the country with a high-octane Air Raid offense while Texas was 14 after a string of painful losses due to special teams (Cal 45–44, missed PAT, Oklahoma State, 30–27 mishandled snap on punt setting up FG) and blowout losses (Notre Dame, 38–3, TCU, 50–7) with Charlie Strong's job already being in question in his second year. The Longhorns' running game pumped out 313 yards, which featured D'Onta Foreman breaking free for an 81-yard rush to set up a TD to put Texas in command 24–10 while the young Texas defense held OU to 67 yards rushing, and sacking OU quarterback Baker Mayfield multiple times as Texas outgunned Oklahoma 24–17, giving Strong his first signature win.

In 2018, Texas came into Dallas ranked No. 19 facing the undefeated No. 7 Oklahoma Sooners, the first time both teams were ranked since 2012. Heisman hopeful Kyler Murray got Oklahoma out to a fast start scoring on a 6-play, 65-yard drive that took only 2:40. On the ensuing possession, Texas, led by sophomore quarterback Sam Ehlinger, answered back with a 5-play 75-yard drive, in what was to be a common theme in the highest scoring game in series history. Texas appeared destined to regain the Golden Hat after taking a commanding 45–24 lead with just under a minute left in the third quarter but three unanswered touchdowns, including a 67-yard run by Kyler Murray that took only 11 seconds, tied the game at 45–45 with just 2:38 left to play. After driving the ball to the Oklahoma 23-yard line, Texas's Freshman kicker, Cameron Dicker, coolly kicked in a 40-yard game-winning field goal with 14 seconds left to play. Sam Ehlinger set the Texas Red River Showdown record for total offense with 394 yards.

On December 1, the two faced off again in AT&T Stadium in Arlington to determine the Big 12 Conference Championship. It was the third time in history when they played again in the same season (1901 and 1903). No. 5 Oklahoma overcame a strong start by No. 14 Texas to win their fourth straight Big 12 title.

On October 12, 2019, the sixth-ranked Sooners defeated the 11th-ranked Longhorns 34–27, getting 366 yards and four touchdowns from quarterback Jalen Hurts, a graduate transfer from Alabama. Though Oklahoma's lead was never larger than 14, Texas was playing from behind for almost the entire game, catching up midway through the third quarter before a 51-yard Hurts touchdown pass to CeeDee Lamb that put the Sooners in front for good.

The October 10, 2020 meeting saw unranked Oklahoma outlasting No. 22 Texas 53–45 in four overtimes, in the third highest-scoring game in the history of the Red River Showdown.

The latest meetings from October 9, 2021 and October 8, 2022 saw two different shades of Texas football. The 2021 matchup saw sixth-ranked Sooners rallying from a 21-point first quarter deficit to edge the 21st-ranked Longhorns 55–48 in the highest-scoring game in the rivalry. In 2022, 3–2 Texas scored 28 in the first half, and went on to record an embarrassing 49–0 shutout over the 3–2 Sooners.

Venue

The Oklahoma–Texas game has been played in six locations. They have played in Norman and Oklahoma City in Oklahoma; Arlington, Austin, Dallas and Houston in Texas. The series began in 1900 and has been played in Dallas since 1912, except for 1913 (Houston), 1922 (Norman), and 1923 (Austin). Dallas was chosen as a "neutral" site since it is situated approximately halfway between Austin, Texas and Norman, Oklahoma – the locations of Texas and Oklahoma, respectively.

Since 1932 the game has been held at the Cotton Bowl in Dallas, during the State Fair of Texas. The designated "home" team alternates from year to year: Oklahoma in even-numbered years and Texas in odd-numbered years. Ticket sales for the game are split 50–50 between the two schools, with the stadium divided along the 50-yard line. Historically, the Oklahoma fans have occupied the south end zone, which contains the tunnel where both teams enter and exit the field. Beginning in 2007, the teams have option to alternate North and South ends of the field, thereby giving the home team fans the seats adjacent to the tunnel leading to both teams' locker rooms. However, Texas has declined to exercise its option to move to the south end each year in which they have been the designated home team. However, former Texas coach Charlie Strong said he would favor Texas fans being in the south end zone during their home games.

On June 10, 2014, Dallas officials announced that the football game between Oklahoma and Texas would be held at Fair Park through 2025.

Notable games

2018
Big 12 Championship: Oklahoma 39 – Texas 27 

In their 2018 regular season matchup, No. 19 Texas beat No. 7 Oklahoma, 48–45 at the Cotton Bowl in Fair Park, on October 6. Later, during the 2018 postseason, the two met in the Big 12 Championship Game after Oklahoma finished first, followed by Texas in the Big 12 standings, which was the first time since 1923 that the two teams played in a location other than Dallas. Oklahoma was victorious by a score of 39–27, winning their fourth consecutive and twelfth overall Big 12 Conference championship.

Game results
Rankings from AP Poll (and CFP Rankings, for 2018 Big 12 Championship Game) - Released prior to game.

Miscellaneous

Highest attendance
The highest attendance in series history is 96,009, occurring first in 2009 and then again in both 2010 and 2011.

Locations

Game trophies
There are three Red River Rivalry trophies given to the winner of the annual Red River Rivalry: the Golden Hat, the Red River Rivalry trophy, and the Governors' trophy.

Golden Hat
The Golden Hat is by far the best known of the three, and the only one to be awarded on the field at the end of the game. The trophy is a gold cowboy hat mounted on a large block of wood. According to The Daily Texan, "...[B]oth teams signed a contract to play in Dallas during the Texas State Fair, beginning with the 1929 season. The deal was for 10 years, but the tradition has carried on for three-quarters of a century. To show its gratitude, the fair donated the Golden Hat trophy, a golden replica of a ten-gallon cowboy hat, which the two teams play for every year. The Longhorns won the first Shootout, but since then the Golden Hat has crossed the Red River many times." The trophy was created in 1941.  When it was created it was known as the "Bronze Hat" or "Brass Hat", and it was bronze in color.  However, when the hat was reworked in the 1970s it came out gold, and is now known as the Golden Hat. The Golden Hat trophy is kept each year by the winning team's athletic department. With the teams meeting twice in 2018 (once in the regular season and once in the Big 12 Conference Championship Game) it was determined that the Golden Hat would not be on the line in the 2nd game as it was in the regular season game.  Therefore, the trophy remained in Austin, Texas, after Texas' 48–45 regular season win over Oklahoma in 2018. Oklahoma won the rematch, 39–27 in the Big 12 Title Game.

Red River Rivalry trophy
Since 2003, the Red River Rivalry trophy has been exchanged between the student bodies of the two schools. This trophy was developed by Alex Yaffe, former OU Student Body President, and Katie King, UT's former student body president. The trophy bears the image of the two states as well as miniature football helmets to represent both teams.

Governors' trophy
There is also a governors' trophy exchanged between the governors of the two states. The governors of Texas and Oklahoma often place a bet on the game such as the losing governor having to present a side of beef to the winning state governor, who then donates the beef to charity.

NROTC trophy
Another annual tradition is the running of game balls by the schools' Naval Reserve Officer Training Corps programs. Each school's ROTC program uses a relay running system to run one game ball all the way from their respective campus to Dallas. Once there, they participate against each other in a football scrimmage, with the winner taking home the Red River Shootout Flag Football Trophy. This trophy is awarded without regard to who wins the main football game.

See also 
 List of NCAA college football rivalry games
 List of most-played college football series in NCAA Division I

References

External links
 Red River Showdown

 
College football rivalries in the United States
Oklahoma Sooners football
Texas Longhorns football
State Fair of Texas